Tetreuaresta bartica is a species of tephritid or fruit flies in the genus Tetreuaresta of the family Tephritidae.

Distribution
Venezuela, Trinidad, Guyana, French Guiana, Brazil.

References

Tephritinae
Insects described in 1933
Diptera of South America